Celiantha is a genus of flowering plants belonging to the family Gentianaceae.

Its native range is Guyana Highlands.

Species:

Celiantha bella 
Celiantha chimantensis 
Celiantha imthurniana

References

Gentianaceae
Gentianaceae genera